Weston Adams II (born September 16, 1938) is an American diplomat, politician, and lawyer in Columbia, South Carolina.

Early life and education
Adams was born in Columbia, South Carolina, the son of Robert Adams IV and Helen Hayes Calhoun. He graduated from the University of South Carolina and from the University of South Carolina School of Law.

Military and political service
Following graduation from law school, Adams served in the Judge Advocate General's Corps of The United States Air Force from 1963-1966. Adams served in the United States Air Force Reserves from 1966-1973, and reached the rank of Major General in the Military Department of South Carolina (2000-2010).

Adams served in the South Carolina House of Representatives from 1972-1974. In 1980, Adams served as a Presidential Elector in the U.S. Electoral College.
 
He was a Delegate to the Republican National Convention in 1976, 1980, 1988, and 1992.

Diplomatic service

In 1982, Ambassador Adams served as a member of the United States Presidential Delegation to the Inauguration of President Salvador Jorge Blanco of the Dominican Republic with the rank of Special Ambassador.  The Delegation was led by Ambassador Ellsworth Bunker, former Ambassador to Italy, India, Argentina, and South Vietnam.

Ambassador Adams served on the U.S. National Commission to UNESCO (United Nations Educational, Scientific and Cultural Organization) from 1982–1984, and he also served on The Council of American Ambassadors.
Under President Ronald Reagan, Adams served as U.S. Ambassador to the Republic of Malawi in southern Africa from 1984-1986.   he was a member of the Wilson Council of the Woodrow Wilson International Center for Scholars.

Legal work
Adams is the managing partner of the Weston Adams Law Firm in Columbia, South Carolina.

Adams served as Associate Counsel to the Select Committee on Crime of the United States House of Representatives from 1970-1971. The U.S. House Select Committee on Crime was established by Congressman Claude Pepper of Florida.

Film work
Adams is an owner of Solar Filmworks as a film producer. He produced and wrote the feature film, The Last Confederate: The Story of Robert Adams (2007) with his son Julian Adams.  The film is a North-South love story about Confederate Captain Robert Adams II, his great grandfather, and his great grandmother, Eveline McCord (Adams) of Philadelphia (the great grandniece of Betsy Ross).

The Last Confederate: The Story of Robert Adams also stars Amy Redford, Mickey Rooney, Tippi Hedren, Edwin McCain, and Bob Dorian. 
It was released in 2007 by ThinkFilm, and won 10 awards on the film festival circuit.

Honors
In 2006 Adams was made Knight of Grace in The Venerable Order of Saint John by Queen Elizabeth II.

In 2007 The University of South Carolina awarded Adams with an honorary doctoral degree.

Adams was granted the Order of the Palmetto by the Governor of South Carolina in 1974.

Adams was made Knight Grand Cross of the Imperial Order of The Holy Trinity (Imperial Ethiopia), and was made Knight Grand Cross of The Imperial Order of Emperor Menelik II (Order of Menelik II, Imperial Ethiopia), by Prince Ermias Sahle Selassie, grandson of Emperor Haile Selassie of Ethiopia.

Adams is a direct descendant of Betsy Ross's sister and is a scholar on Betsy Ross.

Notes and references

References 
 Venerable Order of Saint John - Weston Adams 
 Weston Adams Law Firm
 Council of American Ambassadors: Weston Adams
 Woodrow Wilson International Center for Scholars: Weston Adams
 The American Presidency Project: President Ronald Reagan's Nomination of Weston Adams
 The Last Confederate: The Story of Robert Adams Official Site

External links 
 Weston Adams Law Firm
 Council of American Ambassadors: Weston Adams
 Woodrow Wilson International Center for Scholars: Weston Adams
 The American Presidency Project: President Ronald Reagan's Nomination of Weston Adams
 The Last Confederate: The Story of Robert Adams Official Site

Ambassadors of the United States to Malawi
Living people
Members of the South Carolina House of Representatives
Politicians from Columbia, South Carolina
Lawyers from Columbia, South Carolina
1938 births
20th-century American diplomats
20th-century American politicians
Recipients of orders, decorations, and medals of Ethiopia